The long-billed crow (Corvus validus) is a crow that is endemic to the Northern Maluku Islands. This crow is large with glossy plumage, a large bill and white irises. It is classified by the International Union for Conservation of Nature as a "near-threatened species".

Description
The large bill tapers from a broad base and is black, as are the legs and feet. The plumage is glossy and entirely black. The call of this crow has been likened to the yapping of a puppy "cruk ... cruk ... cruk".

The long-billed crow can be differentiated from other crows by its large size and glossy plumage, its long beak and its white iris. The only other crow within its range is the Torresian crow (Corvus orru) which has a much smaller beak and inhabits more open areas rather than forests.

Distribution and habitat
The long-billed crow is endemic to the Maluku Islands, an archipelago within Indonesia. It is a forest-dwelling bird and is mainly found on the islands of Morotai, Obira, Kayoa, Kasiruta, Bacan and Halmahera.

Status
The forests in which it lives are being degraded and the population of the crow is estimated to be declining. However, it is a common bird and seems able to adapt to a certain extent to secondary forests, partly logged areas, plantations and cultivated areas. The International Union for Conservation of Nature, for a long period of time, rated its conservation status as being of "least concern" but has now upgraded this to "near threatened" because populations seem to be declining more rapidly than was previously thought.

References

long-billed crow
Birds of the Maluku Islands
long-billed crow
long-billed crow